Alan Henning (15 August 1967 – ) was an English taxicab driver-turned-volunteer humanitarian aid worker. He was the fourth Western hostage killed by Islamic State of Iraq and the Levant (ISIL) whose killing was publicised in a beheading video.

Henning was captured during ISIL's occupation of the Syrian city of Al-Dana in December 2013. He was there helping provide humanitarian relief. The British Foreign Office withheld news of Henning's capture while it attempted to negotiate his release.

Local colleagues warned Henning not to cross the border into Syria, but he said he wanted to make sure the supplies were delivered safely.

When he was captured, Henning was a driver for the Worcester-based charity Al-Fatiha Global . Henning was shown at the end of David Cawthorne Haines's execution video, released on 13 September 2014, and was referred to as being the next victim by Mohammed Emwazi, the media described as "Jihadi John" of the ISIL cell described as The Beatles. A video of Henning's beheading was released on 3 October 2014. In an al-Qaeda magazine interview, spokesman Adam Gadahn condemned the beheading. After his murder, British Prime Minister David Cameron ordered MI5, MI6, and GCHQ to track and kill or capture the killer. Emwazi was killed in an American drone strike in 2015.

Early life
Henning was a taxi driver in Salford, Greater Manchester, in North West England before he travelled to Syria in December 2013 to be a volunteer aid worker. He lived in Eccles, Greater Manchester. There has also been a fundraising page set up to help his family.

He was married to Barbara, and had two children, Lucy and Adam.

Kidnapping
In December 2013, Henning was part of a team of volunteers delivering goods and funds to people affected by Syria's civil war. He was abducted on 26 December 2013 by masked gunmen, according to other people in his aid convoy.

Beheading
A video released on 3 October 2014 shows his apparent beheading; the executioner blames it on the UK for its joining the U.S.-led bombing campaign against ISIS.

Before he is beheaded, Henning appears on camera, handcuffed behind his back and in a kneeling position, next to a knife-wielding masked man (Jihadi John, of the ISIL cell known as The Beatles). Henning speaks, referencing the British Parliament's decision to participate in a coalition of countries, such as the United States, that have banded together to bomb the Islamic State in Iraq and Syria.

The end of the video shows American aid worker Peter Kassig, and a threat to his life.

Reactions
Prime Minister David Cameron condemned the killing as "absolutely appalling" and "completely unforgivable" and vowed to do everything to defeat ISIL. He described Henning as a man of great peace, kindness and gentleness, saying: "He went with many Muslim friends out to do no more than simply help other people. His Muslim friends will be mourning him at this special time of Eid and the whole country is mourning with them."

On 5 October 2014, prayers were said for Henning in churches across Bolton. The Bishop of Bolton Rt Rev Chris Edmondson said: "This is the most horrific, brutal and barbaric act. Leaders of Christian and Muslim faiths have universally condemned this act." Bolton Interfaith Council and Bolton Council of Mosques, who had held a vigil for Henning before news of his death, said they would continue to pray for him. A special service of remembrance was held at Eccles Parish Church, attended by Henning's widow. A memorial fund had been set up, by friend and fellow aid-worker Shameela Islam-Zulfiqar, with the aim of raising £20,000. By 9 October 2014, £30,000 had been raised by the Muslim community and would be used to help support Henning's family. A further memorial service was held on 12 October at the British Muslim Heritage Centre, organised by friends and humanitarian aid colleagues of Henning, attracting over 600 people.

On 7 October, former Guantánamo Bay detainee Moazzam Begg said that he had offered to intervene to help secure Henning's release.

The Salafi Muslims of the UK also condemned the murder of Alan Henning noting that ISIS has violated Islam's respect for covenants and that ISIS had also mistreated Henning and the Muslims captured along with him. While a London-based follower of Omar Bakri, Mizanur Rahman (aka Abu Baraa), justified the killing. Mizanur Rahman however was strongly criticised by Salafi Muslims.

On 15 October 2014, Labour MP Barbara Keeley, speaking during Prime Minister's Questions, called for a national honour to recognise Henning's sacrifice, and for support for his widow and children. David Cameron agreed and said he would look carefully at her suggestion.

On 1 April 2020, it was reported that the charity Henning had worked for failed in their duty to safeguard Henning and their other volunteers while working in Syria.

See also
 John Cantlie
 James Foley (journalist)
 Steven Sotloff
 2014 ISIL beheading incidents

References

External links
 .

1967 births
2014 deaths
British humanitarians
British people taken hostage
English terrorism victims
Foreign hostages in Syria
Kidnappings by Islamists
People beheaded by the Islamic State of Iraq and the Levant
Terrorism deaths in Syria
People from Eccles, Greater Manchester
British taxi drivers
British people murdered abroad
Filmed executions